Anguilla competed at the 2022 Commonwealth Games in Birmingham, England between 28 July and 8 August 2022. The team participated in the Games for the seventh time.

Anguilla's team consisted of 13 athletes (12 men and one woman) competing in four sports.

Competitors
Anguilla sent a contingent of 13 competitors to the Games.

The following is the list of number of competitors participating at the Games per sport/discipline.

Athletics

Men
Track and road events

Women
Track and road events

Boxing

Men

Cycling

A squad of four cyclists was selected on 4 April 2022.

Road
Men

Swimming

Anguilla entered one male swimmer, marking the country's debut in the sport at the Commonwealth Games.

Men

References

External links
ACGA Website archive

Nations at the 2022 Commonwealth Games
Anguilla at the Commonwealth Games
2022 in Anguilla